The wedge product in topology may refer to:
The wedge sum, which joins two spaces at a point
The smash product, the product in the category of pointed spaces